MBW may refer to:

 Marc Bridge-Wilkinson (born 1979), English footballer
 Marine Barracks, Washington, D.C., the oldest post in the United States Marine Corps
 Moonshine Branded Wrestling, a Canadian professional wrestling promotion
 MBW (IATA), a general aviation airport for light aircraft located in Mentone, Victoria
 MBW (file format), a proprietary file format containing various disk-level sector backups created by MBRWizard
 Metropolitan Board of Works, the principal instrument of London-wide government from 1855 until the establishment of the London County Council in 1889
 Mr. Brainwash, a French street artist, currently living in Los Angeles also known as MBW
 MacBreak Weekly, a weekly podcast about the Mac, other Apple products and Apple related hardware and software.
Music Business Worldwide, a global music industry news and analysis website
 Memory bandwidth